Kaoru Otsuki (6 August 1888 – 21 December 1970) was a Japanese woman known for being the second wife of Sun Yat-sen, the founder and first president of the Republic of China.

Biography 
Kaoru was born in Yokohama, Kanagawa Prefecture, Japan, on 6 August 1888.

Kaoru first met Sun Yat-sen in Yokohama's Chinatown in 1898, when she knocked over a vase and apologized to Sun. In 1901, Sun asked Kaoru's father for permission to marry his daughter, but Kaoru's father refused because of the great age difference between Sun and Kaori; at the time, Sun was 37 while Kaoru was only 13. A year later, Sun proposed marriage again and Kaoru's father relented. Kaoru and Sun's wedding ceremony was held in Yokohama in 1905 upon his return to Japan after two years. At the time, Sun was still married to his first wife, Lu Muzhen.

However, Sun left Japan for China before Kaoru gave birth to their daughter, Fumiko, on 12 May 1906; he never returned to see his daughter. Out of financial desperation, Kaoru sent Fumiko to the Miyagawa family for adoption in 1911. She had a son named  and a daughter with the latter.

Kaoru was reunited with her daughter Fumiko in 1955, after the latter visited the Tokoji Temple with her eldest son.

Kaoru died on 21 December 1970 at the age of 82. The governments of the People's Republic of China (mainland China) and the Republic of China (Taiwan) have both acknowledged Kaoru's marriage to Sun Yat-sen, and their grandson by Fumiko was invited to the centennial celebrations of the Xinhai Revolution in Wuhan, China, in 2011.

References

Citations

Sources 

 
 
 
 
 

1888 births
1970 deaths
People from Kanagawa Prefecture
Sun Yat-sen family